The Blue Umbrella is a 2005 Indian drama film based on the novel The Blue Umbrella (1980) by Ruskin Bond. It was directed by Vishal Bhardwaj and starred Shreya Sharma and Pankaj Kapur in lead roles. The music was by Bhardwaj and lyrics were penned by Gulzar.

Plot 
The story is set in a small village near Banikhet, Himachal Pradesh and revolves around a nine-year-old girl named Biniya, who lives with her mother and elder brother, and the village's only shopkeeper, Nandakishore "Nandu" Khatri. One day while herding her family cows, Biniya comes across a blue-colored Japanese umbrella belonging to a group of tourists. She takes a liking to the umbrella and trades her bear claw necklace, Yantra, to the Japanese tourists in exchange for it. Biniya's mother scolds her for this, since the bear claw necklace is considered to be auspicious and bring good luck. However, everyone in the village is amazed by the beauty of the umbrella and Biniya acquires a celebrity-like status. This invokes the jealousy of some people, especially Khatri, who covets for such an umbrella but finds himself unable to buy one due to its high cost. He tries to buy Biniya's umbrella from her but she refuses.

Khatri's shop boy, Rajaram, offers his help in stealing the umbrella in exchange for an increased salary. In a pasture, Binya finds her umbrella missing and becomes heartbroken, accusing Khatri of stealing it. Khatri's shop is searched but the umbrella is not found. Due to this humiliation, Khatri pledges to buy his own such umbrella and soon acquires a similar one in red, which he claims is from Delhi. The center of attraction in the village then shifts from Biniya to Khatri. As a gesture of goodwill to restore pride, the villagers nominate Khatri to be the president at an upcoming village wrestling competition. Biniya continues her investigation and learns that Khatri's umbrella was actually sent by a textile dyer from a nearby town, Banikhet. She accompanies the village policeman to Banikhet to find out the truth. At the same time, Khatri is presiding over the competition when it starts raining and the red dye from the umbrella is washed off, revealing Khatri to be the thief. Due to his theft and lying, Khatri is boycotted by the village.

Post-boycott, Khatri's life becomes miserable as no one visits his shop and even his accomplice Rajaram abandons him. Biniya sympathies with Khatri and decides that he is the real owner of umbrella. She willingly gives the umbrella to Khatri, who is then accepted back into the village.

Cast
 Pankaj Kapur as	Nandakishore 'Nandu' Khatri
 Shreya Sharma      ...	Biniya
 Rahul Kumar as	Tikku
 Paramjit Singh Kakran  as	Rajaram
 Piu Dutt               as	Binya's mother
 Samrat Mukerji         as Bijju
 Kamal Tiwari           as Mukhiya
 Dolly Ahluwalia    as Lillavati
 Alok Mathur            as Masterji
 Rajesh Sharma          as Policeman
 Deepak Dobriyal    as Guy with robot
 Manek Bedi         as Arjun

Critical response
The Blue Umbrella received positive reviews, including Hindustan Times writer Khalid Mohamed who describes it as a child's confection 'with passages of charm, visual aplomb and lively performances.' The acting of Pankaj Kapur is noted in particular.

Awards
 2007: National Film Award for Best Children's Film

Soundtrack

References

External links

2005 films
2000s Hindi-language films
Films based on children's books
Indian children's films
Films directed by Vishal Bhardwaj
Films scored by Vishal Bhardwaj
UTV Motion Pictures films
Best Children's Film National Film Award winners
Films based on Indian novels